Franz Xaver Nies (11 June 1859 – 1 November 1897) was a German Catholic missionary of the Society of the Divine Word in Shandong during the late 19th century. Together with his fellow missionary Richard Henle, he was killed in the Juye Incident that led to the German occupation of the Kiautschou Bay concession and was followed by the acquisition of concessions in China by other foreign powers.

Franz Xaver Nies joined the Society of the Divine Word on 7 May 1879, was ordained as a priest by the Bishop of Roermond on 7 June 1884, and dispatched on his mission to China on 1 January 1885.

In his hometown of Rehringhausen, a road (Pater Franz Xaver Nies Weg) has been named after Franz Xaver Nies.

See also
Juye Incident
Richard Henle
Georg Maria Stenz

References

1859 births
1897 deaths
People from Olpe (district)
Divine Word Missionaries Order
German Roman Catholic missionaries
Roman Catholic missionaries in China
German expatriates in China
People murdered in China
German people murdered abroad